Konstantin Vladimirovich Zhiltsov (born 19 January 1983) is a former Russian professional football player.

Club career
Zhiltsov played 3 seasons in the Russian Football National League with FC Lokomotiv Nizhny Novgorod, FC Dynamo Bryansk and FC Nizhny Novgorod.

References

External links
 

1983 births
Sportspeople from Nizhny Novgorod
Living people
Russian footballers
Association football defenders
FC Lokomotiv Nizhny Novgorod players
FC Sokol Saratov players
FC Volga Nizhny Novgorod players
FC Gornyak Uchaly players
FC Nizhny Novgorod (2007) players
FC Nizhny Novgorod (2015) players
FC Khimik Dzerzhinsk players
FC Dynamo Bryansk players
FC Lokomotiv Kaluga players
FC Spartak Kostroma players